Associação Esportiva Jataiense, commonly known as Jataiense, is a Brazilian football club based in Jataí, Goiás state. They competed in the Série C twice.

History
The club was founded on January 10, 1952. They won the Campeonato Goiano Second Level in 2002. Jataiense competed in the Série C in 2004, when they were eliminated in the First Stage, and in 2006, when they reached the Second Stage of the competition.

Achievements

 Campeonato Goiano Second Level:
 Winners (1): 2002

Stadium
Associação Esportiva Jataiense play their home games at Estádio Nelson Silva, nicknamed Arapucão. The stadium has a maximum capacity of 5,000 people.

References

Association football clubs established in 1952
Football clubs in Goiás
1952 establishments in Brazil